Esuk Odu is a village in Uruan local government area of Akwa Ibom state in Nigeria.
Esuk Odu major language is Ibibio and they are enriched with culture. The most prominent occupation among the Esuk Odu residents is Agriculture and Fishing.

References 

Villages in Akwa Ibom